Naknek Lake is a lake in southern Alaska, near the base of the Alaska Peninsula. The lake drains west into Bristol Bay through the Naknek River. The elevation of the lake has lowered over the past 5,000 years as it has cut through a glacial moraine, separating Naknek Lake and Brooks Lake and creating Brooks Falls about 3500 years ago.

The earliest Russian explorer reported the lake's name as Naknek, but a later one said its name was "Akulogak". Ivan Petrof named the lake Lake Walker, for Francis Amasa Walker, Superintendent of the 1880 United States census.

The lake is famous for its sport fishing, supporting one of the largest king salmon fisheries in southwestern Alaska, though the king salmon are greatly outnumbered by sockeye salmon as well as pink and chum salmon. Large rainbow trout are also common around the lake, along with northern pike, lake trout and Arctic char. Brooks Camp is located on the lake's shore where the Brooks River enters the lake over rapids.

Animals

Naknek Lake harbors a wide variety of life, typical of the Alaska Peninsula. Typically observed around the lake are moose, wolves, and occasionally wolverines. However, the lake is most famous for sockeye salmon and grizzly bears. The bears are often seen wandering around the lake or wading into it to catch fish, but they are found in the greatest abundances at Brooks Camp. Bears are seen frequently at Brooks Falls, catching salmon there; they are the main attraction to the lake and Brooks Falls and Camp.

References

Lakes of Alaska
Bodies of water of Bristol Bay Borough, Alaska
Lakes of Lake and Peninsula Borough, Alaska
Tourist attractions in Bristol Bay Borough, Alaska
Tourist attractions in Lake and Peninsula Borough, Alaska
Katmai National Park and Preserve